Təzəkənd (also, Tazakend) is a village and municipality in the Masally Rayon of Azerbaijan.  It has a population of 2,529.

References 

Populated places in Masally District